Jeremiah Akaminko (born 2 May 1988) is a Ghanaian professional footballer who plays as a centre back for the Ghana national team playing for Liga 1 Team Persik Kediri.

Club career
On 25 August 2008 Turkish side Orduspor signed the Heart of Lions team captain on a two-year contract with the Super Lig side. He was nominated as Defender of the Year 2008 in Ghana. Akaminko's contract was subject to renewal after the initial two years and played his first match on 7 September 2008 against Boluspor. There had been reports that the Heart of Lions captain was on the verge of joining Israeli league club Maccabi Tel Aviv F.C. He is noted for his aggressive style of play.

Akaminko left İstanbulspor on 31 January 2019.

International career
Akaminko made his debut and scored his first goal with the Ghana national team on June 1, 2012, in a 2014 FIFA World Cup qualification at the Kumasi Sports Stadium.

International goals

International appearances

See also
James Akaminko
Football in Ghana

References

Eskişehirspor, Akaminko'nun sözleşmesini feshetti, milliyet.com.tr, 13 January 2016

External links
 
 

Ghanaian footballers
Ghana international footballers
Association football defenders
Footballers from Accra
Ghanaian expatriate footballers
Orduspor footballers
Manisaspor footballers
Eskişehirspor footballers
İstanbulspor footballers
1988 births
Living people
Heart of Lions F.C. players
Expatriate footballers in Turkey
Expatriate footballers in Saudi Arabia
Ghanaian expatriate sportspeople in Turkey
Süper Lig players
2013 Africa Cup of Nations players
Ghana youth international footballers